Rokitki  is a village in the administrative district of Gmina Chojnów, within Legnica County, Lower Silesian Voivodeship, in south-western Poland. Prior to 1945 it was in Germany. The Bibran-Modlau and Senden-Bibran families had a large castle and estate here. The neo-gothic structure was torn down in 1956.

The village has a population of 1,010.

References

Rokitki